The Sussex Championships or Sussex County Championships was a men's and women's grass court tennis tournament that were first staged in 1889. By 1972 it was known as the Sussex Tennis Open Championships. The championships were first held in Brighton, East Sussex, England then moved to West Worthing, West Sussex, England and ran only until 1980.

The tournament is no longer a senior level international tour event, but is still staged today as a closed county tournament to British players only.

History
A Sussex County Lawn Tennis Tournament was a brief tennis tournament consisting of a spring tournament usually held in April and another held in autumn usually September. It was originally played on outdoor asphalt courts at Brighton and Hove Rink, England with the exception of the 1884 event that was played on grass courts. In 1882 the organisers staged the spring event. also played on asphalt courts, but for only two editions. there was just four editions of this event but did feature two future Wimbledon Men's singles champions the Renshaw twins it ran until 1885 then was abolished. In 1889 the event was revived as a grass court tournament called the Sussex Championships that was held at Hove County Cricket Ground.

The Sussex Championships was a very successful tournament in the years up to World War I, and was the second largest of the South of England meetings. The September tournament (otherwise called the Autumn Tournament), even when held in August, just before the South of England Championships was the main draw event on the Sussex calendar for many years. In 1911 it became a two-week competition. Many of the leading players  of the day took part in the championships. Following the First World War for some unknown reason, the event failed to gain the longevity it needed to keep the success going, unlike the South of England tournament, rescheduling of the event may have been the cause of its early demise.

Following the start of the open era the Sussex Championships were revived, but this time played at a new location in West Worthing. By 1972 it was known as the Sussex Tennis Open Championships. The championships continued as a two-week tournament until 1978.  The tournament continued up to 1980 when it was abolished for the final time as a senior tour level event. It was a featured county level event on the Mens Amateur Tour (1877-1912), the Women Amateur Tour (1877-1912), the ILTF Mens Amateur Tour (1913-1967) and the ILTF Women's Amateur Tour (1913-1967).

Championship finals

Men's singles
 Incomplete Roll:

Women's singles
 Incomplete Roll:

References

Sources
 Lewis, Ralph Henry (1972). Scene in Sussex: a fresh look at the county,. London: Research Pub. ISBN 9780705000154.
 Myers, Arthur Wallis (1903). Lawn Tennis at Home and Abroad. London: Scribner's sons.
 Nieuwland, Alex. "Tournament – Sussex Championhips". www.tennisarchives.com. Netherlands: Tennis Archives.
 Sussex County Championships Archives. Tennis Sussex. Tennis Sussex. Retrieved 6 October 2022.
 Teague, Bryan (20 November 2016). "History of the Club". sussexcountycroquetclub.org.uk. Sussex County Croquet Club.

Grass court tennis tournaments
Defunct tennis tournaments in the United Kingdom
Tennis tournaments in England